Dawn White (born October 22, 1975) is an American politician and a Republican member of the Tennessee Senate representing the 13th district. She was formerly a member of the Tennessee House of Representatives representing District 37. White was elected to the Tennessee Senate in 2018, filling the seat vacated by Bill Ketron.

Education
White earned her BS in early childhood education and her MEd from Middle Tennessee State University.

Elections
2012 When District 37 Democratic Representative Bill Harmon retired and left the seat open, White won the August 2, 2012 Republican Primary with 3,035 votes (73.2%) and won the November 6, 2012 General election with 14,175 votes (63.2%) against Democratic nominee Robert New.

References

External links
Official page at the Tennessee General Assembly
Campaign site

Dawn White at Ballotpedia
Dawn White at OpenSecrets

Place of birth missing (living people)
1975 births
Living people
Republican Party members of the Tennessee House of Representatives
Middle Tennessee State University alumni
People from Murfreesboro, Tennessee
Women state legislators in Tennessee
21st-century American politicians
21st-century American women politicians